Alfred Spellman is an American film and television producer who co-founded the media studio rakontur.

Early life
Spellman was born in Miami Beach, Florida on November 15, 1978. He graduated from North Miami Beach Senior High School.

Filmography
Raw Deal: A Question of Consent (2001)
Cocaine Cowboys (2006)  
Cocaine Cowboys 2: Hustlin With The Godmother (2008)
Clubland (2008)
The U (2009)
Square Grouper (2011)
Limelight (2011)
Broke (2012)
Collision Course (2013)
The Tanning of America: One Nation Under Hip Hop (2014)
Cocaine Cowboys Reloaded (2014)
The U Part 2 (2014)
Dawg Fight (2015)
Miami Beach 100 (2015)
Magic City Hustle (2019)
Screwball (2019)
537 Votes (2020)
Macho Man (2021)
Cocaine Cowboys: The Kings of Miami (2021)

References

External links 
 
 
 

Living people
American film producers
1978 births